Blood Ballads is a double CD album by the New York City rapper Tragedy Khadafi, released in 2006 on Nocturne Records.

Track listing

Disc 1
Kay Slay Intro
You Can Find Me
American Me
Blinded By Science (featuring Havoc)
Phone Time
Ghetto Med (featuring Nature)
Don't Shit Where You Eat (featuring Immaculate Millz)
It's The Funk (featuring Havoc, Large Professor)
The Hit
Dollar Signs (featuring F.T., Jane Doe, Royal Flush)
Real Live Freestyle (featuring K-Def, Larry-O)
Soledad Brothers (featuring Castro, Shinnobi)
Non-Pulp Fiction (featuring Headrush Napoleon, Killa Sha)
Three The Hard Way
Stretch Armstrong (Freestyle Part 1) (featuring Littles)
Stretch Armstrong (Freestyle Part 2) (featuring Littles)

Disc 2
Thug Paradise
Hood Wars  (featuring Headrush Napoleon, Rasco)
Halfway Thug (featuring Havoc)
What Makes You Think (featuring Killa Sha, MilkMurda)
Bling Monstas (featuring Blackchild, Headrush Napoleon)
Street Life (featuring V-12)
16
Live Motivator
Bloody Murder (Inside My Head) (featuring Black Thought, Chuck D, Pharoahe Monch)
Usual Suspects (featuring DMX, Ja Rule, Mic Geronimo, Styles P)
Doowop (Freestyle)
Get It Together (featuring Solomon)
Kay Slay Freestyle
Ape Something (featuring Killa Sha, Littles, Pretty Ugly)
We Gonna Take It There (featuring Ava Dinero)

References

Tragedy Khadafi albums
2006 albums